The Journal of Management, Spirituality & Religion (JMSR) is a peer-reviewed academic journal on management, spirituality and religion.  It is published five times per year and contains scholarly articles regarding the spiritual and religious aspects of managing and organizing. The journal was established in 2004 and published by Routledge until January 2021. The editor-in-chief is Kathryn Pavlovich (University of Waikato).

JMSR is now published by the International Association of Management, Spirituality & Religion. The journal uses ScholarOne as its platform for manuscript submission and peer review..

Ingenta is the publishing platform.

Abstracting and indexing
The journal is abstracted and indexed in:

References

External links

International Association of Management, Spirituality & Religion
ScholarOne
Manuscript submission
Online access

Business and management journals
Quarterly journals
Publications established in 2004
English-language journals
Religious studies journals